Great Teacher Onizuka, officially abbreviated as GTO, is a Japanese manga series written and illustrated by Tooru Fujisawa. It was originally serialized in Kodansha's Weekly Shōnen Magazine from January 1997 to February 2002, with its chapters compiled into twenty-five tankōbon volumes. The story focuses on 22-year-old ex-bōsōzoku member Eikichi Onizuka, who becomes a teacher at a private middle school, Holy Forest Academy, in Tokyo, Japan. It is a continuation of Fujisawa's earlier manga series Shonan Junai Gumi and Bad Company, both of which focus on the life of Onizuka before becoming a teacher.

Due to the popularity of the manga, several adaptations of GTO were created, including a twelve-episode Japanese television drama running from July to September 1998; a live-action film directed by Masayuki Suzuki and released in December 1999; and a 43-episode anime television series produced by Pierrot, which aired in Japan on Fuji TV from June 1999 to September 2000. A second live-action series aired in Japan during 2012, and two more in 2014.

A sequel manga series, titled GTO: 14 Days in Shonan, ran in Weekly Shōnen Magazine from June 2009 to September 2011. Another sequel, titled GTO: Paradise Lost, began in Weekly Young Magazine in April 2014. Both the anime and manga were licensed in North America by Tokyopop. The anime series was re-licensed by Discotek Media in 2012. The manga is licensed by Kodansha USA.

As of November 2007, the manga had over 50 million copies in circulation, making it one of the best-selling manga series in history. In 1998, Great Teacher Onizuka won the 22nd Kodansha Manga Award in the shōnen category.

Plot

Eikichi Onizuka is a 22-year-old ex-gang member and virgin. While peeping up girls' skirts at a local shopping mall, Onizuka meets a schoolgirl who agrees to go out on a date with him. Onizuka's attempt to sleep with her fails when her current "boyfriend", her teacher, shows up at the love hotel they are in and asks her to return to him. The teacher is old and ugly, but has sufficient influence over her that she leaps from a second-story window and lands in his arms.

Onizuka, upon seeing this display of a teacher's power over girls, decides to become a teacher himself. However, he earns his teaching degree, just barely, at a second-rate college. In his quest, he discovers two important things: he has a conscience and a sense of morality. This means taking advantage of impressionable schoolgirls is out of the question, but their unusually attractive mothers are a different matter. He enjoys teaching and, most of the time, he teaches life lessons rather than routine schoolwork. He hates the system of traditional education, especially when other teachers and administrators have grown ignorant and condescending to students and their needs. With these realizations, he sets out to become the greatest teacher ever, using his own unique brand of philosophy and the ability to do nearly anything when under enough pressure. He is hired as a long-shot teacher by a privately operated middle school, in Kichijōji to tame a class that has driven one teacher to a mysterious death, another to a nervous breakdown, and one other to joining a cult. He embarks on a mission of self-discovery by reaching out to each student one by one and helping each student overcome their problems and learn to enjoy life. He uses methods that are unorthodox, illegal, and life-threatening, yet he manages to succeed in educating and opening up his students.

Production
When writing GTO, Fujisawa was influenced by the writing style of Kōhei Tsuka. The series was originally intended to run for 10 volumes; however, it was extended at the request of the publisher. Fujisawa began to run out of characters as a result. When faced with writing block he would write stories without Onizuka. Onizuka's first name, Eikichi, was taken from musician Eikichi Yazawa. When developing Onizuka's character for the series, Fujisawa sought to incorporate real character traits from Japanese gangs often referred to as "Yankees". Onizuka's look is modelled on such gang members and was not intended to convey an "American look". Onizuka acts tough and confident but is actually shy and lacking in confidence to follow through on some of his desires. He is a simple character that stands by his own reasoning and principles and has his own conscience. Fujisawa gave him the viewpoint that you should take responsibility for your actions, something he sees as important.

Onizuka's role in the school is to provide a bridge between the students and teachers. The character of Fuyutsuki reflects the point of view of the average teacher. Fujisawa highlights his own school experience where teachers were mostly focused only on a good performance record rather than the teaching itself. However, he was able to take an interest in mathematics because of the approach of his teacher. He used this experience to build the series. Tatsuya Egawa has claimed that GTO plagiarized his debut manga, Be Free!.

Media

Manga

Written and illustrated by Tooru Fujisawa, Great Teacher Onizuka was serialized in Kodansha's shōnen manga magazine Weekly Shōnen Magazine from January 8, 1997, to February 13, 2002. Kodansha collected its chapters in twenty-five tankōbon volumes, released from May 16, 1997, to April 17, 2002.

The series was licensed in English by Tokyopop and was one of Tokyopop's first releases in the "Authentic Manga" lineup of titles using the Japanese right-to-left reading style. In doing so the artwork remained unchanged from the original compared to previous publishing methods. The twenty-five volumes were published between April 23, 2002, and August 9, 2005. Kodansha USA republished the series digitally on February 2, 2022.

Sequels and spin-off

A side story series, titled GTO: 14 Days in Shonan, was serialized in Weekly Shōnen Magazine from June 10, 2009, to September 14, 2011. Kodansha compiled its chapters into nine tankōbon volumes, released from October 16, 2009 to November 17, 2011. A three-chapter spin-off, titled Black Diamond, was later published in Weekly Shōnen Magazine in November 2011. A spin-off manga, titled GT-R, focused on Onizuka's friend Ryūji Danma, was published in Weekly Shōnen Magazine from June 27 to October 3, 2012. Kodansha published a compiled tankōbon volume on November 16, 2012.

A sequel, titled GTO: Paradise Lost, started in Kodansha's seinen manga magazine Weekly Young Magazine on April 14, 2014. The manga went on hiatus in June 2015 and resumed publication in December of the same year. The series' first part finished in October 2017, and went on hiatus due to a staff shortage. The manga resumed its publication on May 27, 2019. Kodansha has compiled its chapters into individual tankōbon volumes. The first volume was published on August 6, 2014. As of July 6, 2020, thirteen volumes have been published.

In North America, Vertical announced the English-language release of GTO: 14 Days in Shonan in May 2011. The nine volumes were published from January 31, 2012 to May 28, 2013. Crunchyroll published GTO: Paradise Lost digitally in English. In April 2017, Kodansha USA announced the digital release of the manga.

Anime

A 43-episode anime adaption was produced by Studio Pierrot and directed by Noriyuki Abe, was broadcast on Fuji TV from June 30, 1999, to September 24, 2000. Yoshiyuki Suga provided scripts, having also written scripts for the live-action adaption.

Tokyopop licensed the series for release in North America and released it across 10 DVDs between March 22, 2002, and September 16, 2003, and for American TV broadcast on Showtime's SHONext channel in 2004 and Comcast's Anime Selects on Demand network in 2006. The series was re-released in a 7-disc box set by Discotek Media on September 24, 2013. Crunchyroll began streaming the series in January 2015.

Live-action
A 12-episode live-action Japanese television drama adaption was broadcast on Fuji TV from July 7 to September 22, 1998. The series starred Takashi Sorimachi as Onizuka and had an average audience share of 28.5% with the final episode recording a rate of 35.7%. The final episode was the 8th-most-watched broadcast in the Kantō region during 1998. Several changes were made for the live-action adaption. For example, Fuyutsuki (Nanako Matsushima) is an eager teacher who supports Onizuka in the manga, whereas in the live-action adaptation she initially dislikes Onizuka and wants to leave teaching to become an Air Hostess. A television special was broadcast on June 29, 1999. This was followed by a theatrical movie in January 2000. The film was successful at the box office grossing ¥1.32 billion, becoming the tenth-highest-grossing film of the year. The movie was released in North America by Tokyo Shock on July 26, 2005.
 
During 2012, it was announced that a new live-action series would be broadcast in Japan. Produced by KTV and Media Mix Japan, the series ran from July 3, 2012, until September 11, 2012. Originally, Jin Akanishi was to play the role of Onizuka; however, he was forced to withdraw by his management. Instead, Akira of Japanese band Exile was selected to play Onizuka. An Autumn special was broadcast on October 2, 2012, followed by a New Year's special on January 2, 2013, and a Spring special on April 2, 2013. On March 22, 2014, a 4-part mini-series aired in Taiwan, before being broadcast in Japan at a later date. The mini-series places Onizuka in a Taiwanese school as part of a training program and is a joint Japan/Taiwan co production that contains both Japanese and Mandarin Chinese dialogue. The series has been announced for English subtitled release via the Crunchyroll streaming service. A new series set in Japan aired from July to September 2014.

Reception
As of November 2007, the manga had over 50 million copies in circulation. Great Teacher Onizuka won the 22nd Kodansha Manga Award for the shōnen category in 1998.

In Manga: The Complete Guide, Jason Thompson refers to the series as "shameless, frequently sexist and totally hilarious". He praises the series for staying fresh through imagery, detailed art, and pop culture dialogue. Lastly, he states that the manga "approaches true social satire". He gave the series four stars out of four. In The Dorama Encyclopedia, Jonathan Clements and Motoko Tamamuro note that television adaptation's subject and humorous approach was well received by the teenage audience.

In The Anime Encyclopedia: A Guide to Japanese Animation Since 1917, Jonathan Clements and Helen McCarthy noted the use of computer cloud and water effects in the anime adaptation. While appreciating the advantages of the anime adaption allowing for more violence, they call the first live-action adaption the "quintessential GTO". In 2008, Russian network 2x2 came under investigation by Rossvyazkomnadzor, the government watchdog, for allegedly promoting child pornography by broadcasting GTO.

References

External links

 Studio Pierrot website 
 
 

 
1997 manga
1998 Japanese television series debuts
1999 anime television series debuts
1999 films
2012 Japanese television series debuts
2012 Japanese television series endings
Action anime and manga
Anime series based on manga
Aniplex
Comedy anime and manga
Comics set in Tokyo
Discotek Media
Films scored by Takayuki Hattori
Fuji TV original programming
Japanese drama television series
Japanese comedy-drama films
Japanese high school television series
Japanese television dramas based on manga
Kodansha manga
Pierrot (company)
Sequel comics
Shōnen manga
Teaching anime and manga
Television series about educators
Television shows set in Tokyo
Television shows written by Kazuhiko Yukawa
Tokyopop titles
Winner of Kodansha Manga Award (Shōnen)
Yakuza in anime and manga
Yankī anime and manga